Yekaviyeh-ye Do (also Romanized as Yekāvīyeh-ye Do; also known as Lekāvīgeh-e Do and Lekāvīgeh-ye Do) is a village in Anaqcheh Rural District, in the Central District of Ahvaz County, Khuzestan Province, Iran. In 2006, its population was 74, in 16 families.

References 

Populated places in Ahvaz County